Piano Trio No. 3 may refer to:
 Piano Trio No. 3 (Beethoven)
 Piano Trio No. 3 (Brahms)
 Piano Trio No. 3 (Dvořák)
 Piano Trio No. 3 (Mozart)
 Piano Trio No. 3 (Schumann)